Color blindness or color vision deficiency (CVD) is the decreased ability to see color or differences in color. It can impair tasks such as selecting ripe fruit, choosing clothing, and reading traffic lights. Color blindness may make some academic activities more difficult. However, issues are generally minor, and the colorblind automatically develop adaptations and coping mechanisms. People with total color blindness (achromatopsia) may also be uncomfortable in bright environments and have decreased visual acuity.

The most common cause of color blindness is an inherited problem or variation in the functionality of one or more of the three classes of cone cells in the retina, which mediate color vision. The most common form is caused by a genetic disorder called congenital red–green color blindness. Males are more likely to be color blind than females, because the genes responsible for the most common forms of color blindness are on the X chromosome. Non-color-blind females can carry genes for color blindness and pass them on to their children. Color blindness can also result from physical or chemical damage to the eye, the optic nerve, or parts of the brain. Screening for color blindness is typically done with the Ishihara color test.

There is no cure for color blindness. Diagnosis may allow an individual, or their parents/teachers to actively accommodate the condition. Special lenses such as EnChroma glasses or X-chrom contact lenses may help people with red–green color blindness at some color tasks, but they do not grant the wearer "normal color vision". Mobile apps can help people identify colors.

Red–green color blindness is the most common form, followed by blue–yellow color blindness and total color blindness. Red–green color blindness affects up to 1 in 12 males (8%) and 1 in 200 females (0.5%). The ability to see color also decreases in old age. In certain countries, color blindness may make people ineligible for certain jobs, such as those of aircraft pilots, train drivers, crane operators, and people in the armed forces. The effect of color blindness on artistic ability is controversial, but a number of famous artists are believed to have been color blind.

Effects
A colorblind subject will have decreased (or no) color discrimination along the red–green axis, blue–yellow axis, or both, though the vast majority of the colorblind are only affected on their red–green axis.

The first indication of colorblindness generally consists of a person using the wrong color for an object, such as when painting, or calling a color by the wrong name. The colors that are confused are very consistent among people with the same type of color blindness.

Confusion colors

Confusion colors are pairs or groups of colors that will often be mistaken by the colorblind. Confusion colors for red–green color blindness include:
 Cyan and Grey
 Rose-Pink and Grey
 Blue and Purple
 Yellow and Neon Green
 Red, Green, Orange, Brown
Confusion colors for blue–yellow color blindness include:
 Yellow and Grey
 Blue and Green
 Dark Blue/Violet and Black
 Violet and Yellow-Green
 Red and Rose-Pink
These colors of confusion are defined quantitatively by straight confusion lines plotted in CIEXYZ, usually plotted on the corresponding chromaticity diagram. The lines all intersect at a copunctal point, which varies with the type of color blindness. Chromaticities along a confusion line will appear metameric to dichromats of that type. Anomalous trichromats of that type will see the Chromaticities as metameric if they are close enough, depending on the strength of their CVD. For two colors on a confusion line to be metameric, the Chromaticities first have to be made isoluminant, i.e. to have the same Lightness. Note also that colors that may be isoluminant to the standard observer (typical trichromat) may not be isoluminant to a dichromat.

Color tasks

Cole describes four color tasks, all of which are impeded to some degree by color blindness:
 Comparative – When multiple colors must be compared, such as with mixing paint
 Connotative – When colors are given an implicit meaning, such as red = stop
 Denotative – When identifying colors, for example by name, such as "where is the yellow ball?"
 Aesthetic – When colors look nice – or convey an emotional response – but don't carry explicit meaning

The following sections describe specific color tasks with which the colorblind typically have difficulty.

Food

Colorblindness causes difficulty with the connotative color tasks associated with selecting or preparing food, for example:
 Selecting food for ripeness can be difficult. The green–yellow transition of bananas is particularly hard to identify.
 Detecting bruises, mold or rot on some foods
 Determining when meat is done by color
 Distinguishing some varietals, such as a Braeburn from a Granny Smith apple
 Distinguishing colors associated with artificial flavors (e.g. jelly beans, sports drinks)

Skin color

Changes in skin color due to bruising, sunburn, rashes or even blushing are easily missed by those with red–green colorblindness. These discolorations are often linked to the blood oxygen saturation, which affects skin reflectance.

Traffic lights

The colors of traffic lights can be difficult for the red–green colorblind. This includes distinguishing:
 red/amber lights from sodium street lamps;
 green lights (closer to cyan) from normal white lights.
 Red from amber lights, especially when there are no positional clues available (see image).

The main coping mechanism to overcome these challenges is to memorize the position of lights. The order of the common triplet traffic light is standardized as red–amber–green from top to bottom or left to right. Cases that deviate from this standard are rare. One such case is a traffic light in Tipperary Hill in Syracuse, New York, which is upside-down (green–amber–red top to bottom) due to the sentiments of its Irish American community. However, it has been criticized due to the potential hazard it poses for color-blind drivers.

There are several features of traffic lights available that help accommodate the colorblind:
 British Rail signals use more easily identifiable colors: the red is blood red, the amber is yellow and the green is a bluish color.
 The relative position of traffic lights is fixed internationally as red, amber, green from top to bottom. Horizontal lights will differ depending on the country, but right hand traffic typically follows a "red light always on the left" pattern.
 Most British road traffic lights are mounted vertically on a black rectangle with a white border (forming a "sighting board") so drivers can more easily look for the position of the light.

 In the eastern provinces of Canada, traffic lights are sometimes differentiated by shape in addition to color: square for red, diamond for yellow, and circle for green (see included image of horizontal traffic light from Nova Scotia).

Signal lights

Navigation lights in marine and aviation settings employ red and green lights to signal the relative position of other ships or aircraft. Railway signal lights also rely heavily on red–green–yellow colors. In both cases, these color combinations can be difficult for the red–green colorblind. Lantern Tests are a common means of simulating these light sources to determine not necessarily whether someone is colorblind, but whether they can functionally distinguish these specific signal colors. Those who cannot pass this test are generally completely restricted from working on aircraft, ships or rail.

Fashion

Color analysis is the analysis of color in its use in fashion, to determine personal color combinations that are most aesthetically pleasing.  Colors to combine can include clothing, accessories, makeup, hair color, skin color, eye color, etc. Color analysis involves many aesthetic and comparative color task that can be difficult for the color blind. Most colorblind individuals conservatively avoid brightly colored clothes to avoid combining colors that may be viewed as unaesthetic by people with normal color vision.

Art
Inability to distinguish color does not necessarily preclude the ability to become a celebrated artist. The 20th century expressionist painter Clifton Pugh, three-time winner of Australia's Archibald Prize, on biographical, gene inheritance and other grounds has been identified as a protanope. 19th century French artist Charles Méryon became successful by concentrating on etching rather than painting after he was diagnosed as having a red–green deficiency. Jin Kim's red–green color blindness did not stop him from becoming first an animator and later a character designer with Walt Disney Animation Studios.

Advantages

People with deuteranomaly are better at distinguishing shades of khaki, which may be advantageous when looking for predators, food, or camouflaged objects hidden among foliage. Dichromats tend to learn to use texture and shape clues and so may be able to penetrate camouflage that has been designed to deceive individuals with normal color vision.

Some tentative evidence finds that color blind people are better at penetrating certain color camouflages. Such findings may give an evolutionary reason for the high rate of red–green color blindness. There is also a study suggesting that people with some types of color blindness can distinguish colors that people with normal color vision are not able to distinguish. In World War II, color blind observers were used to penetrate camouflage.

In the presence of chromatic noise, the colorblind are more capable of seeing a luminous signal, as long as the chromatic noise appears metameric to them. This is the effect behind most "reverse" Pseudoisochromatic plates (e.g. "hidden digit" Ishihara plates) that are discernible to the colorblind, but unreadable to color normals.

Digital design

Color codes are useful tools for designers to convey information. The interpretation of this information requires users to perform a variety of Color Tasks, usually comparative but also sometimes connotative or denotative. However, these tasks are often problematic for the colorblind when design of the color code has not followed best practices for accessibility. For example, one of the most ubiquitous connotative color codes is the "red means bad and green means good" or similar systems, based on the classic signal light colors. However, this color coding will almost always be undifferentiable to either Deutans or Protans and therefore should be avoided or supplemented with a parallel connotative system (symbols, smileys, etc.).

Good practices to ensure design is accessible to the colorblind, include:
 When possible (e.g. in simple video games or apps), allowing the user to choose their own colors is the most inclusive design practice.
 Using other signals that are parallel to the color coding, such as patterns, shapes, size or order. This not only helps color blind people, but also aids understanding by normally sighted people by providing them with multiple reinforcing cues.
 Using brightness contrast (different shades) in addition to color contrast (different hues)
 To achieve good contrast, conventional wisdom suggests converting a (digital) design to grayscale to ensure there is sufficient brightness contrast between colors. However, this does not account for the different perceptions of brightness to different varieties of colorblindness, especially Protans, Tritans and Monochromats.
 Viewing the design through a CVD Simulator to ensure the information carried by color is still sufficiently conveyed. At a minimum, the design should be visible for Deutans, the most common kind of colorblindness.
 Maximizing the area of colors (e.g. increase size, thickness or boldness of colored element) makes the color easier to identify. Color contrast improves as the angle the color subtends on the retina increases. This applies to all types of color vision.
 Maximizing brightness (value) and saturation (chroma) of the colors to maximize color contrast.
 Converting connotative tasks to comparative tasks by including a legend, even when the meaning is considered obvious (e.g. red means danger).
 Avoiding denotative color tasks (color naming) when possible. Some denotative tasks can be converted to comparative tasks by depicting the actual color whenever the color name is mentioned; for example, colored typography in "",  or "purple". 
 For denotative tasks (color naming), using the most common shades of colors. For example, green and yellow are colors of confusion in red–green CVD, but it is very common to mix forest green with bright yellow. Mistakes by the colorblind increase drastically when uncommon shades are used, e.g. neon green with dark yellow.
 For denotative tasks, using colors that are classically associated with a color name. For example, use "firetruck" red instead of burgundy to represent the word "red".

Unordered Information

A common task for designers is to select a subset of colors (qualitative colormap) that are as mutually differentiable as possible (salient). For example, player pieces in a board game should be as different as possible.

Classic advice suggests using Brewer palettes, but several of these are not actually colorblind-accessible. A recent, free, powerful tool that checks color contrast of a group of colors is Adobe's Color Blind Safe Tool.

Unfortunately, the colors with the greatest contrast to the red–green colorblind tend to be colors of confusion to the blue–yellow colorblind, and vice versa. However, since red–green is much more prevalent than blue–yellow CVD, design should generally prioritize those users (Deutans, then Protans).

Ordered Information

A common task for data visualization is to represent a color scale, or sequential colormap, often in the form of a heat map or choropleth. Several scales are designed with special consideration for the colorblind and are widespread in academia, including Cividis, Viridis and Parula (Matlab). These comprise a light-to-dark scale superimposed on a yellow-to-blue scale, making them monotonic and perceptually uniform to all forms of color vision.

Classification

Much terminology has existed and does exist for the classification of color blindness, but the typical classification for color blindness follows the von Kries classifications, which uses severity and affected cone for naming.

Based on severity
Based on clinical appearance, color blindness may be described as total or partial. Total color blindness (monochromacy) is much less common than partial color blindness.  Partial colorblindness includes dichromacy and anomalous trichromacy, but is often clinically defined as mild, moderate or strong.

Monochromacy

Monochromacy is often called total color blindness since there is no ability to see color. Although the term may refer to acquired disorders such as cerebral achromatopsia, it typically refers to congenital color vision disorders, namely rod monochromacy and blue cone monochromacy).

In cerebral achromatopsia, a person cannot perceive colors even though the eyes are capable of distinguishing them. Some sources do not consider these to be true color blindness, because the failure is of perception, not of vision. They are forms of visual agnosia.

Monochromacy is the condition of possessing only a single channel for conveying information about color. Monochromats are unable to distinguish any colors and perceive only variations in brightness. Congenital monochromacy occurs in two primary forms:
 Rod monochromacy, frequently called complete achromatopsia, where the retina contains no cone cells, so that in addition to the absence of color discrimination, vision in lights of normal intensity is difficult.
 Cone monochromacy is the condition of having only a single class of cone. A cone monochromat can have good pattern vision at normal daylight levels, but will not be able to distinguish hues. Cone monochromacy is divided into classes defined by the single remaining cone class. However, red and green cone monochromats have not been definitively described in the literature. Blue cone monochromacy is caused by lack of functionality of L (red) and M (green) cones, and is therefore mediated by the same genes as red–green color blindness (on the X chromosome). Peak spectral sensitivities are in the blue region of the visible spectrum (near 440 nm). People with this condition generally show nystagmus ("jiggling eyes"), photophobia (light sensitivity), reduced visual acuity, and myopia (nearsightedness). Visual acuity usually falls to the 20/50 to 20/400 range.

Dichromacy

Dichromats can match any color they see with some mixture of just two primary colors (in contrast to those with normal sight (trichromats) who can distinguish three primary colors). Dichromats usually know they have a color vision problem, and it can affect their daily lives. Dichromacy in humans includes protanopia, deuteranopia, and tritanopia. Out of the male population, 2% have severe difficulties distinguishing between red, orange, yellow, and green. (Orange and yellow are different combinations of red and green light.) Colors in this range, which appear very different to a normal viewer, appear to a dichromat to be the same or a similar color. The terms protanopia, deuteranopia, and tritanopia come from Greek, and respectively mean "inability to see (anopia) with the first (prot-), second (deuter-), or third (trit-) [cone]".

Anomalous trichromacy
Anomalous trichromacy is the mildest type of color deficiency, but the severity ranges from almost dichromacy (strong) to almost normal trichromacy (mild). In fact, many mild anomalous trichromats have very little difficulty carrying out tasks that require normal color vision and some may not even be aware that they have a color vision deficiency. The types of anomalous trichromacy include protanomaly, deuteranomaly and tritanomaly.  It is approximately three times more common than dichromacy. Anomalous trichromats exhibit trichromacy, but the color matches they make differ from normal trichromats. In order to match a given spectral yellow light, protanomalous observers need more red light in a red/green mixture than a normal observer, and deuteranomalous observers need more green. This difference can be measured by an instrument called an Anomaloscope, where red and green lights are mixed by a subject to match a yellow light.

Based on affected cone
There are two major types of color blindness: difficulty distinguishing between red and green, and difficulty distinguishing between blue and yellow. These definitions are based on the phenotype of the partial colorblindness. Clinically, it is more common to use a genotypical definition, which describes which cone/opsin is affected.

Red–green color blindness
Red–green color blindness includes protan and deutan CVD. Protan CVD is related to the L-cone and includes protanomaly (anomalous trichromacy) and protanopia (dichromacy). Deutan CVD is related to the M-cone and includes deuteranomaly (anomalous trichromacy) and deuteranopia (dichromacy). The phenotype (visual experience) of deutans and protans is quite similar. Common colors of confusion include red/brown/green/yellow as well as blue/purple. Both forms are almost always symptomatic of congenital red–green color blindness, so affects males disproportionately more than females. This form of colorblindness is sometimes referred to as daltonism after John Dalton, who had red–green dichromacy. In some languages, daltonism is still used to describe red–green color blindness.

 Protan (2% of males): Lacking, or possessing anomalous L-opsins for long-wavelength sensitive cone cells. Protans have a neutral point at a cyan-like wavelength around 492 nm (see spectral color for comparison)—that is, they cannot discriminate light of this wavelength from white. For a protanope, the brightness of red, is much reduced compared to normal. This dimming can be so pronounced that reds may be confused with black or dark gray, and red traffic lights may appear to be extinguished. They may learn to distinguish reds from yellows primarily on the basis of their apparent brightness or lightness, not on any perceptible hue difference. Violet, lavender, and purple are indistinguishable from various shades of blue. A very few people have been found who have one normal eye and one protanopic eye. These unilateral dichromats report that with only their protanopic eye open, they see wavelengths shorter than neutral point as blue and those longer than it as yellow.

 Deutan (6% of males): Lacking, or possessing anomalous M-opsins for medium-wavelength sensitive cone cells. Their neutral point is at a slightly longer wavelength, 498 nm, a more greenish hue of cyan. Deutans have the same hue discrimination problems as protans, but without the dimming of long wavelengths. Deuteranopic unilateral dichromats report that with only their deuteranopic eye open, they see wavelengths shorter than neutral point as blue and longer than it as yellow.

Blue–yellow color blindness
Blue–yellow color blindness includes tritan CVD. Tritan CVD is related to the S-cone and includes tritanomaly (anomalous trichromacy) and tritanopia (dichromacy). Blue–yellow color blindness is much less common than red–green color blindness, and more often has acquired causes than genetic. Tritans have difficulty discerning between bluish and greenish hues. Tritans have a neutral point at 571 nm (yellowish).

 Tritan (<0.01% of individuals): Lacking, or possessing anomalous S-opsins or short-wavelength sensitive cone cells. Tritans see short-wavelength colors (blue, indigo and spectral violet) as greenish and drastically dimmed, some of these colors even as black. Yellow and orange are indistinguishable from white and pink respectively, and purple colors are perceived as various shades of red. Unlike protans and deutans, the mutation for this color blindness is carried on chromosome 7. Therefore, it is not sex-linked (equally prevalent in both males and females). The OMIM gene code for this mutation is 304000 "Colorblindness, Partial Tritanomaly".

 Tetartan is the "fourth type" of colorblindness, and a type of blue–yellow color blindness. However, its existence is hypothetical and given the molecular basis of human color vision, it is unlikely this type could exist.

Summary of cone complements
The below table shows the cone complements for different types of human color vision, including those considered color blindness, normal color vision and 'superior' color vision. The cone complement contains the types of cones (or their opsins) expressed by an individual.

Causes

Color blindness is any deviation of color vision from normal trichromatic color vision (often as defined by the standard observer) that produces a reduced gamut. Mechanisms for color blindness are related to the functionality of cone cells, and often to the expression of photopsins, the photopigments that 'catch' photons and thereby convert light into chemical signals.

Color vision deficiencies can be classified as inherited or acquired.
 Inherited: inherited or congenital/genetic color vision deficiencies are most commonly caused by mutations of the  genes encoding opsin proteins. However, several other genes can also lead to less common and/or more severe forms of color blindness.
 Acquired: color blindness that is not present at birth, may be caused by chronic illness, accidents, medication, chemical exposure or simply normal aging processes.

Genetics
Color blindness is typically an inherited genetic disorder. The most common forms of colorblindness are associated with the Photopsin genes, but the mapping of the human genome has shown there are many causative mutations that don't directly affect the opsins. Mutations capable of causing color blindness originate from at least 19 different chromosomes and 56 different genes (as shown online at the Online Mendelian Inheritance in Man [OMIM]).

Genetics of red–green color blindness

By far the most common form of colorblindness is congenital red–green color blindness (Daltonism), which includes protanopia/protanomaly and deuteranopia/deuteranomaly. These conditions are mediated by the OPN1LW and OPN1MW genes, respectively, both on the X chromosome. An 'affected' gene is either missing (as in Protanopia and Deuteranopia - Dichromacy) or is a chimeric gene (as in Protanomaly and Deuteranomaly).

Since the OPN1LW and OPN1MW genes are on the X chromosome, they are sex-linked, and therefore affect males and females disproportionately. Because the colorblind 'affected' alleles are recessive, color blindness specifically follows X-linked recessive inheritance. Males have only one X chromosome (XY), and females have two (XX); Because the male only has one of each gene, if it is affected, the male will be colorblind. Because a female has two alleles of each gene (one on each chromosome), if only one gene is affected, the dominant normal alleles will "override" the affected, recessive allele and the female will have normal color vision. However, if the female has two mutated alleles, she will still be colorblind. This is why there is a disproportionate prevalence of colorblindness, with ~8% of males exhibiting colorblindness and ~0.5% of females.

Genetics of blue–yellow color blindness

Blue–yellow color blindness is a rarer form of colorblindness including tritanopia/tritanomaly. These conditions are mediated by the OPN1SW gene on Chromosome 7.

Other genetic causes
Several inherited diseases are known to cause color blindness:
 achromatopsia(also called rod monochromatism, stationary cone dystrophy or cone dysfunction syndrome)
 cone dystrophy
 cone-rod dystrophy
 Leber's congenital amaurosis
 retinitis pigmentosa(initially affects rods but can later progress to cones and therefore color blindness).

They can be congenital (from birth) or can commence in childhood or adulthood. They can be stationary, that is, remain the same throughout a person's lifetime, or progressive. As progressive phenotypes involve deterioration of the retina and other parts of the eye, many of the above forms of color blindness can progress to legal blindness, i.e. an acuity of 6/60 (20/200) or worse, and often leave a person with complete blindness.

Non-genetic causes
Physical trauma can cause color blindness, either neurologically – brain trauma which produces swelling of the brain in the occipital lobe – or retinally, either acute (e.g. from laser exposure) or chronic (e.g. from ultraviolet light exposure).

Color blindness may also present itself as a symptom of degenerative diseases of the eye, such as cataract and age-related macular degeneration, and as part of the retinal damage caused by diabetes. Vitamin A deficiency may also cause color blindness.

Color blindness may be a side effect of prescription drug use. For example, red–green color blindness can be caused by ethambutol, a drug used in the treatment of tuberculosis. Blue–yellow color blindness can be caused by sildenafil, an active component of Viagra. Hydroxychloroquine can also lead to hydroxychloroquine retinopathy, which includes various color defects. Exposure to chemicals such as styrene or organic solvents can also lead to color vision defects.

Simple colored filters can also create mild color vision deficiencies. John Dalton's original hypothesis for his deuteranopia was actually that the vitreous humor of his eye was discolored:

An autopsy of his eye after his death in 1844 showed this to be definitively untrue, though other filters are possible. Actual physiological examples usually affect the blue–yellow opponent channel and are named Cyanopsia and Xanthopsia, and are most typically an effect of yellowing or removal of the lens.

The opponent channels can also be affected by the prevalence of certain cones in the retinal mosaic. The cones are not equally prevalent and not evenly distributed in the retina. When the number of one of these cone types is significantly reduced, this can also lead to or contribute to a color vision deficiency. This is one of the causes of tritanomaly.

Diagnosis

Color vision test

The main method for diagnosing a color vision deficiency is in testing the color vision directly. The Ishihara color test is the test most often used to detect red–green deficiencies and most often recognized by the public. Some tests are clinical in nature, designed to be fast, simple, and effective at identifying broad categories of color blindness. Others focus on precision and are generally available only in academic settings.
 pseudoisochromatic plates, a classification which includes the Ishihara color test and HRR test, embed a figure in the plate as a number of spots surrounded by spots of a slightly different color. These colors must appear identical (metameric) to the colorblind, but distinguishable to color normals. Pseudoisochromatic Plates are used as screening tools because they are cheap, fast and simple, but they do not provide precise diagnosis of CVD.
 Lanterns, such as the Farnsworth Lantern Test, project small colored lights to a subject, who is required to identify the color of the lights. The colors are those of typical signal lights, i.e. red, green and yellow, which also happen to be colors of confusion of red–green CVD. Lanterns do not diagnose colorblind, but they are occupational screening tests to ensure an applicant has sufficient color discrimination to be able to perform a job.

 Arrangement tests can be used as screening or diagnostic tools. The Farnsworth–Munsell 100 hue test is very sensitive, but the Farnsworth D-15 is a simplified version used specifically for screening for CVD. In either case, the subject is asked to arrange a set of colored caps or chips to form a gradual transition of color between two anchor caps.
 Anomaloscopes are typically designed to detect red–green deficiencies and are based on the Rayleigh match, which compares a mixture of red and green light in variable proportions to a fixed spectral yellow of variable luminosity. The subject must change the two variables until the colors appear to match. They are expensive and require expertise to administer, so are generally only used in academic settings.

Genetic testing
While genetic testing cannot directly evaluate a subject's color vision (phenotype), most congenital color vision deficiencies are well-correlated with genotype. Therefore, the genotype can be directly evaluated and used to predict the phenotype. This is especially useful for progressive forms that do not have a strongly color deficient phenotype at a young age. However, it can also be used to sequence the L- and M-Opsins on the X-Chromosome, since the most common alleles of these two genes are known and have even been related to exact spectral sensitivities and peak wavelengths. A subject's color vision can therefore be classified through genetic testing, but this is just a prediction of the phenotype, since color vision can be affected by countless non-genetic factors such as your cone mosaic.

Management
Despite much recent improvement in gene therapy for color blindness, there is currently no FDA approved treatment for any form of CVD, and otherwise no cure for CVD currently exists. Management of the condition by using lenses to alleviate symptoms or smartphone apps to aid with daily tasks is possible.

Lenses

There are three kinds of lenses that an individual can wear that can increase their accuracy in some color related tasks (although none of these will "fix" color blindness or grant the wearer normal color vision):

 A red-tint contact lens worn over the non-dominant eye, will leverage binocular disparity to improve discrimination of some colors. However, it can make other colors more difficult to distinguish. A 1981 review of various studies to evaluate the effect of the X-chrom (one brand) contact lens concluded that, while the lens may allow the wearer to achieve a better score on certain color vision tests, it did not correct color vision in the natural environment. A case history using the X-Chrom lens for a rod monochromat is reported and an X-Chrom manual is online.
 Tinted glasses (e.g. Pilestone/Colorlite glasses) apply a tint (e.g. magenta) to incoming light that can distort colors in a way that makes some color tasks easier to complete. These glasses can circumvent many colorblind tests, though this is typically not allowed.
 Glasses with a notch filter (e.g. EnChroma glasses) filter a narrow band of light that excites both the L and M cones (yellow–green wavelengths). When combined with an additional stopband in the short wavelength (blue) region, these lenses may constitute a neutral-density filter (have no color tint). They improve on the other lens types by causing less distortion of colors and will essentially increase the saturation of some colors. They will only work on trichromats (anomalous or normal), and unlike the other types, do not have a significant effect on Dichromats. The glasses do not significantly increase one's ability on colorblind tests.

Aids
Many mobile and computer applications have been developed to aid color blind individuals in completing color tasks:

 Some applications can identify a color—by name or RGB code—of a color on screen or the color of an object by using the device's camera.
 Some applications will make images easier to interpret by the colorblind by enhancing color contrast in natural images and/or information graphics. These methods are generally called daltonization algorithms.
 Some applications can simulate color blindness by applying a filter to an image or screen that reduces the gamut of an image to that of a specific type of color blindness. While they don't directly help colorblind people, they allow those with normal color vision to understand how people with color blindness see the world. Their use can help improve inclusive design by allowing designers to simulate their own images to ensure they are accessible to the colorblind.

In 2003, a cybernetic device called eyeborg was developed to allow the wearer to hear sounds representing different colors. Achromatopsic artist Neil Harbisson was the first to use such a device in early 2004; the eyeborg allowed him to start painting in color by memorizing the sound corresponding to each color. In 2012, at a TED Conference, Harbisson explained how he could now perceive colors outside the ability of human vision.

Epidemiology

Color blindness affects a large number of individuals, with protans and deutans being the most common types. In individuals with Northern European ancestry, as many as 8 percent of men and 0.4 percent of women experience congenital color deficiency. Interestingly, even Dalton's very first paper already arrived upon this 8% number:

History

During the 17th and 18th century, several philosophers hypothesized that not all individuals perceived colors in the same way:

The phenomenon only came to be scientifically studied in 1794, when English chemist John Dalton gave the first account of colour blindness in a paper to the Manchester Literary and Philosophical Society, which was published in 1798 as Extraordinary Facts relating to the Vision of Colours: With Observations. Genetic analysis of Dalton's preserved eyeball confirmed him as having deuteranopia in 1995, some 150 years after his death.

Influenced by Dalton, German writer J. W. von Goethe studied color vision abnormalities in 1798 by asking two young subjects to match pairs of colors.

In 1875, the Lagerlunda train crash in Sweden brought color blindness to the forefront. Following the crash, Professor Alarik Frithiof Holmgren, a physiologist, investigated and concluded that the color blindness of the engineer (who had died) had caused the crash. Professor Holmgren then created the first test for color vision using multicolored skeins of wool to detect color blindness and thereby exclude the colorblind from jobs in the transportation industry requiring color vision to interpret safety signals. However, there is a claim that there is no firm evidence that color deficiency did cause the collision, or that it might have not been the sole cause.

In 1920, Frederick William Edridge-Green devised an alternative theory of color vision and color blindness based on Newton's classification of 7 fundamental colors (ROYGBIV). Edridge-Green classified color vision based on how many distinct colors a subject could see in the spectrum. Normal subjects were termed hexachromic as they could not discern Indigo. Subjects with superior color vision, who could discern indigo, where heptachromic. The colorblind were therefore dichromic (equivalent to dichromacy) or tri-, tetra- or pentachromic (anomalous trichromacy).

Rights
In the United States, under federal anti-discrimination laws such as the Americans with Disabilities Act, color vision deficiencies have not been found to constitute a disability that triggers protection from workplace discrimination.

A Brazilian court ruled that people with color blindness are protected by the Inter-American Convention on the Elimination of All Forms of Discrimination against Person with Disabilities. At trial, it was decided that the carriers of color blindness have a right of access to wider knowledge, or the full enjoyment of their human condition.

Occupations
Color blindness may make it difficult or impossible for a person to engage in certain occupations. Persons with color blindness may be legally or practically barred from occupations in which color perception is an essential part of the job (e.g., mixing paint colors), or in which color perception is important for safety (e.g., operating vehicles in response to color-coded signals). This occupational safety principle originates from the aftermath of the 1875 Lagerlunda train crash, which Alarik Frithiof Holmgren blamed on the color blindness of the engineer and created the first occupational screening test against the colorblind.

Color vision is important for occupations using telephone or computer networking cabling, as the individual wires inside the cables are color-coded using green, orange, brown, blue and white colors. Electronic wiring, transformers, resistors, and capacitors are color-coded as well, using black, brown, red, orange, yellow, green, blue, violet, gray, white, silver, gold.

Driving

Red–green colorblindness can make it difficult to drive, primarily due to the inability to differentiate red–amber–green traffic lights. Protans are further disadvantaged due to the darkened perception of reds, which can make it more difficult to quickly recognize brake lights. In response, some countries have refused to grant driver's licenses to individuals with color blindness:
 In April 2003, Romania removed color blindness from its list of disqualifying conditions for learner driver's licenses. It is now qualified as a condition that could potentially compromise driver safety, therefore a driver may have to be evaluated by an authorized ophthalmologist to determine if they can drive safely. As of May 2008, there is an ongoing campaign to remove the legal restrictions that prohibit colorblind citizens from getting driver's licenses.
 In June 2020, India relaxed its ban on driver's licenses for the colorblind to now only apply to those with strong CVD. While previously restricted, those who test as mild or moderate can now pass the medical requirements.
 Australia instituted a tiered ban on the colorblind from obtaining commercial driver's licenses in 1994. This included a ban for all protans, and a stipulation that deutans must pass the Farnsworth Lantern. The stipulation on deutans was revoked in 1997 citing a lack of available test facilities, and the ban on protans was revoked in 2003.
 All colorblind individuals are banned from obtaining a driver's license in China and since 2016 in Russia (2012 for dichromats).

Piloting aircraft

Although many aspects of aviation depend on color coding, only a few of them are critical enough to be interfered with by some milder types of color blindness. Some examples include color-gun signaling of aircraft that have lost radio communication, color-coded glide-path indications on runways, and the like. Some jurisdictions restrict the issuance of pilot credentials to persons with color blindness for this reason. Restrictions may be partial, allowing color-blind persons to obtain certification but with restrictions, or total, in which case color-blind persons are not permitted to obtain piloting credentials at all.

In the United States, the Federal Aviation Administration requires that pilots be tested for normal color vision as part of their medical clearance in order to obtain the required medical certificate, a prerequisite to obtaining a pilot's certification. If testing reveals color blindness, the applicant may be issued a license with restrictions, such as no night flying and no flying by color signals—such a restriction effectively prevents a pilot from holding certain flying occupations, such as that of an airline pilot, although commercial pilot certification is still possible, and there are a few flying occupations that do not require night flight and thus are still available to those with restrictions due to color blindness (e.g., agricultural aviation). The government allows several types of tests, including medical standard tests (e.g., the Ishihara, Dvorine, and others) and specialized tests oriented specifically to the needs of aviation. If an applicant fails the standard tests, they will receive a restriction on their medical certificate that states: "Not valid for night flying or by color signal control". They may apply to the FAA to take a specialized test, administered by the FAA. Typically, this test is the "color vision light gun test". For this test an FAA inspector will meet the pilot at an airport with an operating control tower. The color signal light gun will be shone at the pilot from the tower, and they must identify the color. If they pass they may be issued a waiver, which states that the color vision test is no longer required during medical examinations. They will then receive a new medical certificate with the restriction removed. This was once a Statement of Demonstrated Ability (SODA), but the SODA was dropped, and converted to a simple waiver (letter) early in the 2000s.

Research published in 2009 carried out by the City University of London's Applied Vision Research Centre, sponsored by the UK's Civil Aviation Authority and the U.S. Federal Aviation Administration, has established a more accurate assessment of color deficiencies in pilot applicants' red/green and yellow–blue color range which could lead to a 35% reduction in the number of prospective pilots who fail to meet the minimum medical threshold.

See also
 List of people with color blindness
 Motion blindness
 Red–green color model - A color model that mimics tritan color blindness
 Tetrachromacy
 Color anomia - Ability to see colors, but inability to name colors.
 Color agnosia - Ability to see colors, but inability to recognize colors.

References

Further reading

External links

 
 "A Glossary of Color Science."

Color vision
Genetic disorders by system
Visual disturbances and blindness
X-linked recessive disorders
Wikipedia medicine articles ready to translate
Agnosia
Wikipedia neurology articles ready to translate